Robert Denis Browne-Clayton (June 24, 1917 – September 5, 2003) was a Canadian politician. He served in the Legislative Assembly of British Columbia from 1948 to 1949  from the electoral district of Cariboo, a member of the Coalition government.

References

1917 births
2003 deaths